Dulyovo porcelain works is a Russian porcelain manufacturer based in the Moscow Oblast. Its products are better known as Dulevo porcelain. The works were founded in the Dulyovo wasteland (now Likino-Dulyovo) in 1832 by merchant Terenti Kuznetsov from Gzhel.  

Dulevo porcelain factory produced many sets and sculptures during the Soviet period. Designers included Pyotr Vasilyevich Leonov, Mikhail Mikhailovich Adamovich (between 1927 and 1933), Alexey Georgievich Sotnikov, Vladimir Klimentyevich Yasnetsov, Asta Davydovna Brzhezitskaya, Olga Mikhailovna Bogdanova, Evgeniya Ilyinichna Gatilova, and Nina Aleksandrovna Malysheva. Some designs were created by the Hungarian-born Eva Zeisel, before she fell foul of Stalin. 

Dulyovo porcelain has gained gold awards at world's fairs in Paris (1937, for Leonov's tea set "Beauty") and Brussels (1958, for "The Falcon"). In 1976 the factory was awarded the Order of Lenin.

Notes

External links 
 

Ceramics manufacturers of Russia
Companies established in 1832
Manufacturing companies of the Soviet Union
Porcelain
Russian brands
Companies nationalised by the Soviet Union
Companies based in Moscow Oblast